Barbara Aronstein Black (born 1933) is an American legal scholar. Born and raised in Brooklyn, She was the first woman to serve as dean of an Ivy League law school. when she became Dean of Columbia Law School in 1986. Black is the George Wellwood Murray Professor of Legal History at Columbia.

Black received her B.A. from Brooklyn College in 1953, her LL.B. from Columbia Law School in 1955, and a Ph.D. from Yale University in 1975. While at Law School, she was editor of the Columbia Law Review.

Black was elected a Fellow of the American Academy of Arts and Sciences in 1989 and a member of the American Philosophical Society in 1991. She was also for two years president of the American Society for Legal History.

Black's work has been concentrated in the area of contracts and legal history. She is a recipient of the Elizabeth Blackwell Award and of the Federal Bar Association Prize of Columbia Law School.

Barbara Black is the widow of constitutional scholar and civil rights pioneer Charles Black, with whom she had three children, two sons and a daughter. She left Academia for a time to focus on raising her children, and returned in 1965.

References

External links 
 Columbia Law School Faculty Profile

1933 births
American women lawyers
American lawyers
American legal scholars
Brooklyn College alumni
Columbia Law School alumni
Deans of Columbia Law School
Fellows of the American Academy of Arts and Sciences
Deans of law schools in the United States
Women deans (academic)
Legal historians
Living people
Yale University alumni
American academic administrators
American women legal scholars
American women academics
21st-century American women
Members of the American Philosophical Society